DXUP (105.5 FM) is a radio station owned and operated by the Community Media Education Council. Its studios and transmitter are located along Rizal Blvd., Brgy. Nuro, Upi, Maguindanao. This serves as the community station for the town of Upi.

References

Radio stations established in 2004